The 1927 Tour de France was the 21st edition of the Tour de France, taking place from 19 June to 17 July.

This tour featured the first win by Nicolas Frantz, a cyclist from Luxembourg. Frantz had come in second in the previous tour, and went on to win the tour in 1928 as well. It also showcased the debuts of André Leducq (4th) and Antonin Magne (6th), two French riders who would win the Tour de France in coming years.

Because Tour director Henri Desgrange was dissatisfied with the tactics used in the long flat stages in the previous years, the individual team start format was introduced, similar to the later team time trial. In this concept, used in stages 1 to 9, 14 and 18 to 23, teams left fifteen minutes after each other. The concept did not make the race more interesting, so after the 1929 Tour de France, it was removed again.

Innovations and changes
In 1926 and previous years, in the flat stages without mountains most cyclists finished together, and the winner was determined by a bunch sprint. The Tour organisation did not like this, because they wanted the cyclists to ride individually, and have a more spectacular race. For this reason, most of the flat stages in the 1927 Tour de France were started separately, with 15 minutes in between teams, and the touriste-routiers starting last. The idea was that the stars of the race could not see their rivals, and had no choice but to ride as fast as they could on every stage.

In 1926, as an experiment the Tour started outside Paris, in the Alps. In 1927, this decision was reverted, and the Tour started again in Paris. The route of the 1927 Tour de France was similar to other Tours before 1926 that started in Paris, only some stages had been split, making the average stage shorter, from 338 km per stage in 1926 to 221 km per stage in 1927.

Teams

Race overview

In the first stage, the Alcyon-team suffered twenty punctures. The Dilecta-Wolber team won the first stage, led by Francis Pélissier, who was the first leader of the general classification.

In the sixth stage, Francis Pélissier abandoned sick. His teammate Ferdinand Le Drogo became the new leader. In the seventh stage, Le Drogo was in the yellow jersey in the region where he was born. His supporters cheered for him, and he got excited and sped away from his teammates. That costed him too much energy, and he lost 20 minutes in that stage to the J.B. Louvet team, so the lead was transferred to Hector Martin, from the J.B. Louvet team. In stage 8, the Dilecta team lost more than one hour, and they saw nothing left to win, and abandoned the race. At the end of stage 9, when the first group of team-time-trials stopped, there were only 57 cyclists left in the race, 35 of which were touriste-routiers, and only 22 had sponsors.

The first mountain stage was stage eleven. In that stage, touriste-routier Michele Gordini escaped secretly from the peloton. When the peloton found out he was away, he had already built a 45-minute advantage, and was the virtual leader of the race. Then he suffered from mechanical problems, and was passed before the end of the stage. Frantz won the stage, and took the yellow jersey.

In stages 12 and 13, Frantz finished in the leading group. Stage 14 was run in the team-time-trial format, and did not cause big changes in the general classification. Frantz then won the fifteenth stage and finished second in the sixteenth stage, and increased his lead to more than one hour. In the seventeenth stage, Frantz lost 15 minutes to second-placed Maurice De Waele, but because this was the last mountain stage, he had practically secured the victory.

The rest of the stages did not cause big changes in the general classification. The only exception was the 23rd stage, where De Waele lost more than half an hour, but his margin to the third-placed rider was large enough.

Results
In stages 1 to 9 and 18 to 23, the cyclists started in teams, each 15 minutes apart; the touriste-routiers started last. The cyclist who reached the finish fastest was the winner of the stage. In stages 10 to 17, all cyclists started together.
The time that each cyclist required to finish the stage was recorded. For the general classification, these times were added up; the cyclist with the least accumulated time was the race leader, identified by the yellow jersey.

Stage winners

General classification

Other classifications
The organing newspaper, l'Auto named a meilleur grimpeur (best climber), an unofficial precursor to the modern King of the Mountains competition. This award was won by Michele Gordini.

Aftermath
The experiment with the team-time-trial-like stages was not considered successful; the change did not have the effect that cyclists were riding more individually, but the stronger teams became even stronger. For the 1928 Tour de France, the system was used again, but in 1929 it was reduced to a few stages, and it disappeared completely in the 1930 Tour de France.

The French cyclists had not been successful in the last Tours de France; they had their last overall victory in 1923, and 1926 did not even see a French stage victory. In 1927, the French cyclists had 5 stage victories, and two cyclists in the top ten: André Leducq and Antonin Magne. Leducq would later win the Tour de France in 1930 and 1932, while Magne would win the Tour de France in 1931 and 1934.

Notes

References

Bibliography

External links

 
1927 in French sport
1927
1927 in road cycling
June 1927 sports events
July 1927 sports events